is a Japanese actor.  Though he has played a wide range of characters, he is perhaps best known for his portrayal of yakuza figures, most notably in the films of Takeshi Kitano.

Terajima made his acting debut in 1986's A Homansu.  He joined Japan Music Entertainment in December 2018.

Early life
Terajima was born in Fukagawa, downtown of Tokyo. He is the second son of three and his father was a tatami craftsman. His childhood memory was when he and his mother walking to kindergarten together and his teacher called him "mu-chan" because of his cute face. Terajima's interest in acting began when he watched an action-comedy movie, Truck Yarou. He also loved to sing, impersonating members of the pop duo Pink Lady with his friends.
After graduating from high school, to pursue his dream of becoming an actor, he enrolled at Mifune Art Academy to continue his education, although his parents did not agree with his decision as they wanted him to continue working in the family business. During those years, Terajima did many side jobs, including work as a stuntman, until he met Yusaku Matsuda, who directed A Homansu and gave Terajima a minor role in the movie.

Career
Terajima played a supporting role in Violent Cop (1989), where he met his respectful mentor, Takeshi Kitano. His breakthrough as an actor was in Kitano's Sonatine. After the success of Sonatine, Terajima went on to enjoy a successful career playing various roles in television and film, usually in a supporting position, but occasionally as the lead character, such as in Hirokazu Kore-eda's After Life and Sabu's The Blessing Bell (2002).

Selected filmography

Film

 A Homansu (1986)
 Itoshino Half Moon (1987)
 Violent Cop (1989)
 A Scene at the Sea (1992)
 Sonatine (1993)
 Elephant Song (1994)
 Getting Any? (1995)
 Okaeri (1995)
 Marks (1995)
 Suit Yourself or Shoot Yourself: The Hero (1996)
 Kids Return (1996)
 Postman Blues (1997)
 Hana-bi (1997)
 Unlucky Monkey (1998)
 After Life (1998)
 Shark Skin Man and Peach Hip Girl (1998)
 Eyes of the Spider (1998)
 Taboo (1999)
 Dead or Alive (1999)
 Brother (2000)
 Hole in the Sky (2001)
 Distance (2001)
 Ichi the Killer (2001)
 The Blessing Bell (2002)
 Harmful Insect (2002)
 Moon Child (2003)
 Casshern (2004)
 The Taste of Tea (2004)
 Nobody Knows (2004)
 Custom Made 10.30  (2005)
 Takeshis' (2005)
 Funky Forest (2005)
 Hana (2006)
 Unfair (2006)
 The Uchoten Hotel  (2006)
 Hula Girls (2006)
 Unfair SP (2006)
 Green Mind, Metal Bats (2006)
 Unfair: The Movie (2007)
 Kantoku Banzai  (2007)
 Still Walking (2008)
 All Around Us (2008)
 The Magic Hour (2008)
 Achilles and the Tortoise (2008)
 Air Doll (2009)
 Goemon (2009)
 Wagaya no Rekishi (2010)
 Zatoichi: The Last (2010)
 Ninja Kids!!! (2011)
 Smuggler (2011)
 Unfair: The Answer SP (2011)
 Helter Skelter (2012)
 Human Trust (2013)
 The Kiyosu Conference (2013) – Kuroda Kanbei
 When Marnie Was There (2014)
 April Fools (2015)
 Chasuke's Journey (2015)
 Doubutsu Sentai Zyouohger (2016) 
 Love's Twisting Path (2019)
 Hit me Anyone One More Time (2019)
 Last of the Wolves (2021) – Yōji Kakutani
 Noise (2022)
 Yudō (2023)

Television

 Sanada Maru (2016) – Ideura Masasuke
 What Will You Do, Ieyasu? (2023) - Mizuno Nobumoto

Video games
 Yakuza 2 as Jiro Kawara (2006)
 Yakuza Kenzan as Itō Ittōsai (2008)
 Yakuza Kiwami 2 as Jiro Kawara (2017)

Books
Terajima no aniki ni kike yo! Komatta toki wa itsudemo koi! (2007) ISBN 978-4-576-07018-6
Teppen toru made (2020) ISBN 978-4-591-16586-7

References

External links
 Japan Music Entertainment profile 
 
 

Japanese male film actors
1963 births
Living people
People from Tokyo
Actors from Tokyo
People from Kōtō